General Manuel Hélder Vieira Dias Jr, known by the nickname "Kopelipa", is an Angolan general, former public official, and businessman with close ties to former Angolan President José Eduardo dos Santos. In 2014, his net worth was estimated at close to $3 billion.

Family Background

Kopelipa belongs to an important Angolan family with strong ties to the MPLA. He is the nephew of Carlos Aniceto Vieira Dias, known as “Liceu,” who was a founder of the band Ngola Ritmos and the MPLA; the cousin of musician Ruy Alberto Vieira Dias Mingas, who wrote the music for Angola Avante, Angola's national anthem; the cousin once removed of Filomeno do Nascimento Vieira Dias, the Archbishop of Luanda; and the cousin of opposition politician Filomeno Vieira Lopes.

Public Role

Kopelipa is the former director of the National Reconstruction Office, a top governmental position in Angola.  He is — along with fellow "top generals" Higino Carneiro, João Maria de Sousa, Roberto Leal Monteiro, and Kundi Paihama — one of the military leaders holding top ministerial posts for the People's Movement for the Liberation of Angola, the political party that has ruled Angola since it gained its independence from Portugal in 1975.  The general has been referred to as "the highest and most trusted member of the president’s entourage" and was a member of the trio of officials known as Dos Santos’s "Presidential Triumvirate,” along with Manuel Vicente and General Leopoldino “Dino” Fragoso do Nascimento.

References

Living people
MPLA politicians
1953 births